Cartwright Valley is a hanging valley that is for the most part free of ice, lying east of Mount Aeolus in the Olympus Range, Victoria Land. It was named by the Advisory Committee on Antarctic Names (1997) after Keros Cartwright of the Illinois State Geological Survey, who made hydrogeological studies with Henry Harris in Victoria Valley, Wright Valley, and Taylor Valley during the Dry Valley Drilling Project; 1973–74, 1974–75, and 1975–76 seasons.

References
 

Valleys of Victoria Land
McMurdo Dry Valleys